Ilam is one of four urban municipalities of Ilam District, which lies in the Mahabharata hilly range of Province No. 1, eastern Nepal. Ilam also acts as the headquarters of Ilam District. Being the largest producer region for Nepali tea, its tea farms comprise a major tourist attraction in Province No. 1. Ilam is also famous for its natural scenery and landscapes as well as its diverse agricultural economy which specializes in horticultural crop production.

The municipality is divided into 12 wards. The 74 kilometer section of Mechi highway connects Ilam with the east–west highway and subsequently, with the provincial capital of Biratnagar.

Background
Ilam (Ilam Bazar; the core area) was established as the headquarters of Ilam Gauda in 1818 (1875 BS) and was declared as "Ilam Municipality" in 1958 but gazetted to "Nepal Rajpatra" only in 1962.

During the Panchayat System in Nepal (in 1960), the municipality used to be known as Ilam Nagar Panchayat.

In 1990, following the end of the Panchayat System, Ilam regained its official name of Ilam Municipality.

In 2015, with the amendment of the new Constitution of Nepal, Godak, Soyak, Barbote, part of Maipokhari Sumbek, Puwamajhuwa, part of Sangrumba, part of Siddhithumka and Sakhejung Village Development Committee were incorporated to it.

Etymology
The word ‘Ilam’ comprises two words-‘I’ and ‘Lam’. In Limbu language, the word ‘I’ means ‘winding’ and ‘lam’ denotes the way. The topography of this Ilam aptly depicts several winding paths crisscrossing.

Demography
According to 2011 Nepal census, the total population in Ilam was 48,563 and the main inhabitants of Ilam were Limbu, Rai, Yakkha, Lepcha, Newar, Magar, Tamang, Chettri, Bahun, Sunuwar and Gurung.

Education
Ilam has many educational institutions. Ilam's major campus is Mahendra Ratna Multiple Campus, a first QAA certified constituent campus of Tribhuvan University. It has four faculties; Science, Humanities, Education, and Commerce. It provides education in undergraduate and post graduation subjects. From 2069 BS (2012 AD) under the affiliation from Tribhuvan University, the Institute of Agriculture and Animal Science, MRM Campus has started offering bachelor's degrees in Science in Horticulture. In addition to students from Ilam district, students from Jhapa, Morang, Sunsari, Panchthar, Taplejung, Dhankuta, Kathmandu, Janakpur, Pokhara, Chitwan, Banke, Gorkha, Lamjung, Rupandehi are here to study horticulture.

There are other institutes which provide higher education such as Adarhsa HSS, Modern Campus, Ilam Technical college, Heritage National Academy, Ilam Vidya Mandir. Green Valley Academy which provides secondary level education is regarded as one of the best schools in eastern Nepal due to its high-ranking SLC result.

Transportation

Regular buses are available from New Buspark, Koteshwor and Kalanki of Kathmandu which takes to Ilam after a bus ride of about 16 hours. An airport is under construction at Sukilumba Danda.

Daily Bus/Bolero is available from Ilam to Taplejung, Phidim, Birtamod, Chandragadhi, Kakarbhitta, Siliguri (West Bengal), Pashupatinagar, Damak, Itahari, Dharan and Biratnagar. A new buspark is being constructed at Sera. Besides these, Bus/Bolero also goes to all the VDCs of Ilam district.

Tea production 

Tea production in Ilam (as Nepal tea) started as early as 1863, when the Chinese government offered then Prime Minister Jung Bahadur Rana tea saplings that were then planted in Ilam. In 1868, the Ilam tea factory was established, and tea plantations covered over 135 acres of land. In 2010, the tea factory was privatized, and is currently not under operation. However, tea production continues in Ilam in other forms. Many local people gets employment from this.

In 2010, the total tea production of Nepal is 16.23 million kilograms per annum; a majority of this amount is produced in Ilam.

Economy

New Hotels are being opened in Ilam for tourism. Ilam is known for its six "A"s: are Alu (Potato), Alan (Milk), Alainchi (Cardamom), Aduwa (Ginger), Amriso (Broom Grass), and Akabare khursani (Round Chillies). Alongside these tea, bamboo, flowers and silk are also produced in Ilam. Agricultural commodities helps to increase the Agricultural Gross Development Product. Beside these, the tourism sector also contributes in the economy of Ilam.

Ilam bazaar has got haat on Sundays and Thursdays every week.

Climate
It is cold in Ilam during the winter, mild in summer and foggy in the monsoon season.

Environmentalism in Ilam
Ilam municipality is also known for its innovations in environmentalism. In 2010, the municipality became the first one in Nepal to ban plastic bags from the market, this is the great success all over the Nepal. The district also set aside 38 ropanis (>19,000 square metres) of land in the same year for processing degradable waste. In addition, Ilam's network of microhydropower produces more reliable electricity than is available in the rest of Nepal.

Media
Ilam has three FM radio station namely Ilam FM (93 Mz), Nepalbani FM (94.9 MHz), Chiyabari FM (88.2 MHz) which are Community radio station and Fikkal FM (90.6 MHz). They aim to promote local culture by various programs of infotainment.  Chiyabari Daily, Ilam Express, Ilam Post and Sandakpur are daily newspaper published from Ilam. In addition to these, several weekly newspaper like Pawanbhumi and Ilam Awaj are published in Ilam.and chulachuli darpan also

References

Populated places in Ilam District
Municipalities in Koshi Province
Hill stations in Nepal
Nepal municipalities established in 1962
Municipalities in Ilam District